The 2020 Tampa Bay Rowdies season was the club's eleventh season of existence, their fourth in the United Soccer League, and second in the USL Championship. Including the previous Tampa Bay Rowdies, this was the 27th season of a franchise in the Tampa Bay metro area with the Rowdies moniker. Including the now-defunct Tampa Bay Mutiny, this was the 33rd season of professional soccer in the Tampa Bay region.

Club

Roster

Technical staff
  Neill Collins – head coach /technical director
  Stuart Dobson – assistant coach
  Kevin Foley – assistant coach
  Chad Burt – assistant coach
  Pete Calabrese – performance coach
  Eric Rudland – chief scout

Medical staff
  Andrew Keane – head athletic trainer
  Michelle Leget – assistant athletic trainer
  Dr. Mohit Bansal – team physician and orthopedic surgeon
  Dr. Vania Reyes – team physician, sports medicine

Front office
  Stuart Sternberg – owner 
  Lee Cohen –president and chief operating officer
  Matthew Silverman – vice chairmen 
  Brian Auld – vice chairmen

Competitions

Exhibitions 
The Rowdies hosted Major League Soccer teams in the Suncoast Invitational for the fifth year in a row.

USL Championship

Standings — Group H

Results summary

Results by round

Results

USL Championship playoffs

Bracket

Results

U.S. Open Cup

Honors
 USL Championship finalist
 USL Group H Champion
 USL Eastern Conference Champion

Individual honors
USL All-League
 Forrest Lasso
USL Defender of the year
 Forrest Lasso (2020)

References 

Tampa Bay Rowdies
Tampa Bay Rowdies (2010–) seasons
Tampa Bay Rowdies
Tampa Bay Rowdies
Sports in St. Petersburg, Florida